Are the Kids Alright? is a documentary film which explores mental health care for children and youths at risk in Texas. The filmmaker, Ellen Spiro, gained unprecedented access to troubled children and their families, as well as the judicial, psychiatric and correctional institutions. By following several different families, the filmmakers document the results of the decline in the availability of mental health services for the youth who most desperately need it.

Awards and conference screenings
 Emmy for Outstanding Documentary (2005)
Texas Mental Health Association Award
Best of Austin / Most Pertinent Media
United Nations Association Film Festival
Merit Award, Superfest International Disability Film Festival
Western Psychological Association
Picture This... Disability Film Festival

Articles
Geisler, Erin, "Professor’s documentary wins Emmy award", University of Texas at Austin press release, October 18, 2005.  Retrieved June 22, 2007.
 "Documentary Illustrates Issues of Children’s Mental Health in Texas", HF News, vol. 38, Spring/Summer 2004, Hogg Foundation for Mental Health. Retrieved June 22, 2007.

External links
 Are the Kids Alright? official website
 

2004 television films
2004 films
American documentary films
Documentary films about mental health
Documentary films about children
Documentary films about health care
2004 documentary films
Films directed by Ellen Spiro
2000s English-language films
2000s American films